The Coupe de France Final 1998 was a football match held at Stade de France, Saint-Denis on May 2, 1998, that saw Paris SG defeat RC Lens 2-1 thanks to goals by Raí and Marco Simone.Vladimir Smicer scored for the Division 1 champion which could not enjoyed two successes. This final was also the first ever played in the new Stade de France.

Match details

See also
Coupe de France 1997-98

External links
Coupe de France results at Rec.Sport.Soccer Statistics Foundation
Report on French federation site

Coupe
1998
Coupe De France Final 1998
Coupe De France Final 1998
Coupe de France Final
Sport in Saint-Denis, Seine-Saint-Denis
Coupe de France Final